The West River is a river in the Whitefish River and Lake Huron drainage basins in southwestern Sudbury District in Northeastern Ontario, Canada.

References 

Rivers of Sudbury District